A Natural History of the Senses is a 1990 non-fiction book by  American author, poet, and naturalist Diane Ackerman. In this book, Ackerman examines both the science of how the different senses work, and the varied means by which different cultures have sought to stimulate the senses. The book was the inspiration for the five-part Nova miniseries Mystery of the Senses (1995) in which Ackerman appeared as the presenter.

“What is most amazing is not how our senses span distance or cultures, but how they span time. Our senses connect us intimately to the past, connect us in ways that most of our cherished ideas never could.”

References

External links
New York Times Book Review
 A Natural History of the Senses, Reviews

Sensory systems
1990 non-fiction books